opened in Shibetsu, Hokkaidō, Japan in 1991. It is dedicated to the ecology of the world's salmonids and to Hokkaidō's salmon culture. In 1992 there were 130,000 visitors, while in 2011 the number dropped to 50,000.

See also
 Salmon conservation
 Shellfish Museum of Rankoshi

References

External links
 Shibetsu Salmon Science Museum 
 Shibetsu Salmon Science Museum 

Museums in Hokkaido
Natural history museums in Japan
Shibetsu, Hokkaido (town)
1991 establishments in Japan
Museums established in 1991
Aquaria in Japan
Salmon
Fishing museums